
Jacob Palis Jr. (born 15 March 1940) is a Brazilian mathematician and professor. Palis' research interests are mainly dynamical systems and differential equations. Some themes are global stability and hyperbolicity, bifurcations, attractors and chaotic systems.

Biography
Jacob Palis was born in Uberaba, Minas Gerais. His father was a Lebanese immigrant, and his mother was a Syrian immigrant. The couple had eight children (five men and three women), and Jacob was the youngest. His father was a merchant, owner of a large store, and supported and funded the studies of his children. Palis said that he already enjoyed mathematics in his childhood.

At 16, Palis moved to Rio de Janeiro to study engineering at the University of Brazil – now UFRJ. He was approved in first place in the entrance exam, but was not old enough to be accepted; he then had to take the university's entry exam again a year later, at which again he obtained first place. He completed the course in 1962 with honours and receiving the award for the best student.

In 1964, he moved to the United States. In 1966 he obtained his master's degree in mathematics under the guidance of Stephen Smale at the University of California, Berkeley, and in 1968 his PhD, with the thesis On Morse-Smale Diffeomorphisms, again with Smale as advisor.

In 1968, he returned to Brazil and became a researcher at the Instituto Nacional de Matemática Pura e Aplicada (IMPA) in Rio de Janeiro, Brazil.
Since 1973 he has held a permanent position as professor at IMPA, where he was director from 1993 until 2003.  He was Secretary-General of the Third World Academy of Sciences from 2004 to 2006, and elected its president in 2006 and remained on position till December 2012. He was also president of the International Mathematical Union from 1999 to 2002. He was president of the Brazilian Academy of Sciences from 2007 to 2016. Palis has advised more than forty PhD students so far from more than ten countries.

Awards and honors
Palis has received numerous medals and decorations. He is a foreign member of several academies of sciences, including the United States National Academy of Sciences, the French Academy of Sciences and German Academy of Sciences Leopoldina. In 2005 Palis received the Legion of Honor.

He is a member of the Norwegian Academy of Science and Letters. In 2010 he was awarded the Balzan Prize for his fundamental contributions in the mathematical theory of dynamical systems that has been the basis for many applications in various scientific disciplines, such as in the study of oscillations. He is also a recipient of the 1988 TWAS Prize.

Selected publications
 On Morse-Smale Dynamical Systems, Topology 19, 1969 (385–405). 
 Structural Stability Theorems, with S. Smale, Proceedings of the Institute on Global Analysis, American Math. Society, Vol. XIV, 1970 (223–232).
 Cycles and Bifurcations Theory, with S. Newhouse, Asterisque 31, Société Mathématique de France, 1976 (44–140).
 The Topology of Holomorphic Flows near a Singularity, with C. Camacho and N. Kuiper, Publications Math.Institut Hautes Études Scientifiques 48, 1978 (5–38).
 Moduli of Stability and Bifurcation Theory, Proceedings of the International Congress of Mathematicians, Helsinki, 1978 (835–839).
 Stability of Parameterized Families of Gradient Vector Fields, with F. Takens, Annals of Mathematics 118, 1983 (383–421). 
 Cycles and Measure of Bifurcation Sets for Two-Dimensional Diffeomorphisms, with F. Takens, Inventiones Mathematicae 82, 1985 (397–422).  
 Homoclinic Orbits, Hyperbolic Dynamic and Fractional Dimensions of Cantor Sets (Lefschetz Centennial Conference) Contemporary Mathematics - American Mathematical Society, 58, 1987 (203–216).
 Hyperbolicity and Creation of Homoclinic Orbits, with F.Takens, Annals of Mathematics 125, 1987 (337–374). 
 On the C1 Omega-Stability Conjecture, Publications Math. Institut Hautes Études Scientifiques, 66, 1988 (210–215).
 Bifurcations and Global Stability of Two-Parameter Families of Gradient Vector Fields with M. J. Carneiro, Publications Math. Institut Hautes Études Scientifiques 70, 1990 (103–168).
 "Homoclinic Tangencies for Hyperbolic Sets of Large Hausdorff Dimension", with J. C. Yoccoz, Acta Mathematica 172, 1994, pp. 91–136.
 High Dimension Diffeomorphisms Displaying Infinitely Many Sinks, with M. Viana, Annals of Mathematics 140, 1994 (207–250). 
 A Global View of Dynamics and a Conjecture on the Denseness of Finitude of Attractors.  Astérisque. France:, v. 261, pp. 339–351, 2000.
 Homoclinic tangencies and fractal invariants in arbitrary dimension, with C. Moreira and M. Viana, C R Ac Sc Paris., 2001.  
 Nonuniformily hyperbolic horseshoes unleashed by homoclinic bifurcations and zero density of attractors, with J.-C. Yoccoz, C R Ac Sc Paris., 2001.
Books published
 Geometric Theory of Dynamical Systems, with W. de Melo. Springer-Verlag, 1982; also published in Portuguese, Russian and Chinese.
 Hyperbolicity and Sensitive-Chaotic Dynamics at Homoclinic Bifurcations, Fractal Dimensions and Infinitely Many Attractors, with F. Takens. Cambridge Univ. Press, 1993; Second Edition, 1994.

References

External links
 Jacob Palis' homepage 
 
 Jacob Palis International Balzan Prize Foundation
 Interview (in Portuguese)

1940 births
Living people
21st-century Brazilian mathematicians
People from Uberaba
University of California, Berkeley alumni
Foreign associates of the National Academy of Sciences
Members of the French Academy of Sciences
Members of the Norwegian Academy of Science and Letters
Members of the Brazilian Academy of Sciences
Foreign Members of the Russian Academy of Sciences
Foreign members of the Chinese Academy of Sciences
Foreign Fellows of the Indian National Science Academy
Dynamical systems theorists
Instituto Nacional de Matemática Pura e Aplicada researchers
20th-century Brazilian mathematicians
TWAS laureates
Members of the German Academy of Sciences Leopoldina
Presidents of the International Mathematical Union